Lego Batman 2: DC Super Heroes is a 2012 Lego-themed action-adventure game developed by Traveller's Tales and published by Warner Bros. Interactive Entertainment. The game is a sequel to Lego Batman: The Videogame and the second installment in the Lego Batman series. The game's main storyline follows Batman, Robin and later Superman as they attempt to foil the Joker and Lex Luthor's plans to have the latter become president of the United States, joining forces with the Justice League along the way. As a result, the game's cast is larger than its predecessor and includes characters outside of the Batman series.

The game is presented in a third-person perspective, with missions in the game showing an emphasis on exploration. The player is able to complete various side missions within the fictional Gotham City to unlock characters and use them within missions once completed. The game is the first in Traveller's Tales' Lego series to feature spoken dialogue and an open world.

Lego Batman 2 was released worldwide for the Microsoft Windows, PlayStation 3, Wii, Xbox 360, PlayStation Vita, Nintendo 3DS and Nintendo DS in June 2012. An OS X version of the game, published by Feral Interactive, was released in September 2012, followed by a Wii U version in May 2013. A mobile version of the game, titled Lego Batman: DC Super Heroes was released for iOS in March 2013 and for Android in March 2016. The game received generally positive reviews for most platforms, and mixed reviews for the 3DS and Vita, and sold 3.4 million copies by March 2013. A film adaptation was released on Blu-ray and DVD in May 2013 as a compilation of cutscenes from the game. A standalone sequel, Lego Batman 3: Beyond Gotham was released in November 2014, followed by a spin-off, Lego DC Super-Villains, in October 2018.

Gameplay
Lego Batman 2: DC Super Heroes is an action-adventure open-world game, and is in some ways similar to the Batman: Arkham series. The gameplay is similar to Lego Batman: The Videogame, and presented in the third-person perspective where the playable character is allowed access through the visible elements of the 3D space they are in, although some missions force the camera to be in a 2.5D perspective. The game is set primarily within Gotham City, although Metropolis is also visited as part of a mission. The player can freely explore Gotham City and unlock various characters within it, and some elements of Gotham City are broken into "bricks", which the player can use to build new suits or construct objects that can help solve puzzles.

Like its predecessor, the player can defeat enemies by using the abilities each character provides, such as Superman's super freeze or the Joker's handbuzzer, as well as traditional combat moves such as standard punches and kicks. Most enemies in the game don't carry weapons, although boss levels may have certain weapons or abilities that the player must counter. Combat rewards the player with studs, which the player can use to purchase new characters to use in the game's free roam section, and thereby contributes to their "True Hero" percentage for the mission. Some suits from Lego Batman: The Videogame return in Lego Batman 2, such as the magnetic suit for Robin, and the sonic, demolition and sonars suit for Batman. Certain adjustments exist between the two games, including the addition of a glass shattering gun to the glide suit (now called the bat suit), and the addition of a gun that can store water to the bio suit (now called the hazard suit). New suits available in Lego Batman 2 include the acrobat suit allowing for Robin to traverse areas that require acrobatics, magnet suit allowing for Robin to traverse areas with magnets and control magnetic elements, and ice suit to freeze water for Robin, and the sensor suit to go invisible and view X-rays, power suit to destroy silver objects and use super strength, and electricity suit to transfer energy between switches and move through areas with electricity for Batman.

The game takes approximately 15 hours to complete, with the main missions taking 9 hours and the various extras taking 6 hours. These extras take multiple forms. One such form is Citizen in Peril, where a citizen has put themself in a situation within the various missions where they must be saved by the hero. Another is each mission's gold bricks, which can be obtained through destroying certain objects, and a similar system exists with each mission's "minikits" wherein challenges must be completed in order to find them. Completing these various extras contributes to the total game's completion percentage.

Once a mission has been completed, it can be replayed at any time using the various characters that the player has unlocked in order to complete the aforementioned extras or to accrue more studs to purchase various characters.

A local multiplayer mode is also present using a split screen. The decision to use a split screen was due to the game's open-world environment. The Wii U version allows the use of the GamePad's screen instead of a split screen, allowing both players to have independent screens.

Unlike its predecessor, Lego Batman 2 features 50 playable characters from outside Gotham City, such as Superman and Wonder Woman. The Xbox 360 and PlayStation 3 versions of Lego Batman 2 feature exclusive downloadable content with two packs of characters, the Heroes Pack and the Villains Pack. Nightwing, Katana, Shazam, Zatanna and Damian Wayne are playable in the Heroes Pack, while Bizarro, Captain Cold, Black Adam, Black Manta and Gorilla Grodd are playable in the Villains Pack. These packs were included with pre-orders from some retailers, such as Best Buy and Amazon for the Heroes Pack, and GameStop for the Villains Pack.

Synopsis

Characters

Lego Batman 2 features a larger cast of characters than its predecessor and is the first Traveller's Tales Lego game to feature full spoken dialogue, as opposed to the mime acting, grunts and mumbles of the previous games. Returning characters from Lego Batman: The Videogame include Batman (Troy Baker), Robin (Charlie Schlatter) and the Joker (Christopher Corey Smith), as well as Alfred Pennyworth (Steve Blum, who also voices Bane, Ra's al Ghul and the Penguin), James Gordon (Townsend Coleman, who also voices Mr. Freeze and the Mad Hatter), Clayface (Fred Tatasciore, who also voices Killer Croc), the Riddler (Rob Paulsen), Harley Quinn (Laura Bailey), Scarecrow (Nolan North), Poison Ivy (also voiced by Bailey) and Catwoman (Katherine Von Till). Baker also reprises his role as Two-Face from Batman: Arkham City.

Characters new to the series include Superman (Travis Willingham), Lex Luthor (Clancy Brown, who reprises the role from the DC Animated Universe), Martian Manhunter (Cam Clarke), The Flash (also voiced by Schlatter), Wonder Woman (also voiced by Bailey), Green Lantern (also voiced by Clarke), Cyborg (Brian Bloom), Aquaman (also voiced by Bloom), Lois Lane (Bridget Hoffman), Supergirl (also voiced by Hoffman), Vicki Vale (Anna Vocino) and Captain Cold (also voiced by Blum, reprising his role from Batman: The Brave and the Bold). Brainiac (also voiced by Baker) makes a cameo appearance in the game. Clarke also served as the voice director of the game.

Plot
At an award show held in Gotham City, Lex Luthor loses the "Man of the Year" award to Bruce Wayne. Suddenly, the ceremony is interrupted by a group of villains led by the Joker, who rob the audience and steal the award. As the Joker presents a film about himself, which showcases his laughing gas that can make people temporarily adore him, Bruce dons the Batsuit and, with Robin's help, defeats Harley Quinn, the Riddler, Two-Face and the Penguin. The Joker escapes via motorboat, but Batman and Robin pursue him to Amusement Mile and capture him.

As the villains are sent to Arkham Asylum, Superman arrives to congratulate Batman and Robin, much to the former's perceived chagrin. Meanwhile, Luthor, believing the Joker's gas could help him get elected president, breaks the Joker out of Arkham using the "Deconstructor", a kryptonite-powered weapon that can deconstruct unbreakable black objects. The Joker uses the Deconstructor to release more inmates before escaping with Luthor. Batman and Robin respond to Commissioner Gordon's distress call and round up the Penguin, Two-Face, Harley, the Riddler, Catwoman, Bane and Poison Ivy in the asylum's courtyard, as well as Scarecrow inside the asylum, before realizing the Joker has escaped.

While responding to a break-in at Ace Chemicals, Batman and Robin realize it was the Joker's doing and search for clues, but the factory is destroyed by a series of explosive chemical reactions caused by the Joker before he left. The pair are rescued by Superman, who puts out the fire, but Batman declines his help in finding the Joker. Batman discovers the chemicals Joker stole could be mixed into synthetic kryptonite, and uses the Batmobile's on-board computer to track their signature to Luthor's mobile operations center. Batman and Robin board the vehicle and confront Luthor and the Joker, but are thrown out into the street before the Joker uses the Deconstructor to destroy the Batmobile. Unable to continue the pursuit, the pair return to the Batcave to analyze a piece of synthetic kryptonite they retrieved, unaware it contains a tracking device, which Luthor and the Joker use to find them. The villains destroy the Batcave and steal Batman's supply of real kryptonite, which was their target all along. Batman and Robin are again rescued by Superman, whom the former reluctantly allows to help.

While Robin salvages what is left of Batman's equipment, Batman and Superman travel to Metropolis and infiltrate LexCorp, stumbling upon a giant Joker-esque robot piloted by Luthor and the Joker. The villains use the robot's kryptonite weapon to subdue Superman and crush Batman with a large crate, unaware that the heroes had swapped costumes prior. Having survived, Batman and Superman pursue the robot and destroy its flying gear before Superman is exposed to its kryptonite power source, causing him and Batman to crash-land in Gotham. The pair make their way to the city hall, where Luthor discovers that the Joker's gas' affectionate properties were only effective on the Joker, not Luthor. Following another fight with the robot, Superman damages its power source, causing it to leak liquid kryptonite, but is left completely weakened. Robin arrives in a multi-colored Batmobile, which counters the Deconstructor's effects, and he and Batman trick Luthor and the Joker into chasing them around Gotham. The kryptonite creates a giant Joker face, which is seen from the Watchtower by Martian Manhunter, who contacts the rest of the Justice League: Wonder Woman, Cyborg, Green Lantern and the Flash. Once they arrive to help, Luthor concedes defeat but attempts to destroy Wayne Tower in an act of retaliation against Bruce Wayne.

Superman recovers his strength and he and Wonder Woman try to save Wayne Tower, while the others battle the Joker robot on top, sending it plummeting onto the street below. With the robot destroyed, the Joker and Luthor (now wearing power armor) come out to fight the heroes, but are ultimately defeated, while Green Lantern rebuilds Wayne Tower's supports, stabilizing it. As the two villains are arrested, Gordon thanks Batman for saving the day, to which he admits he could not have done it without his friends' help, and that he is glad to have friends that he can always count on. As the League prepare to rebuild the Batcave, Green Lantern shoots a beacon from his power ring into space in victory. The beacon is seen by Brainiac, who utters "I have located it"; hinting at its appearance in LEGO Batman 3 Beyond Gotham

Development

Concept
The idea of a sequel to Lego Batman: The Videogame began shortly after its release. The success of the first game led TT Games to begin development of a sequel. Early in the development process, a open-world design system was considered and later built upon.

Design
The decision to include voice acting into the game was brought up by co-director Jonathan Smith, which resulted in large discussions about voice acting versus mimes and grunts from previous Lego games. After development on the cutscenes had begun, voices were inevitably added.

An idea was brought up to introduce traffic and pedestrians to Gotham City. When development on Gotham City had begun, the development team quickly had issues implementing such a system. After consideration from Jon Burton, the idea was scrapped in favor of a chaotic city with burned-up vehicles and fleeing pedestrians.

Music
An original score was written by the game's composer, Rob Westwood. In addition, the game's background music also consists of Danny Elfman's score from Batman (1989) and John Williams' score from Superman (1978).

Marketing
Prior to the game's official trailer, a promo for the game was leaked online by Lego fansite Bricktuts. On March 15, 2012, the game's first reveal trailer featuring gameplay was released to the public. The reveal trailer attracted almost a million views, and another trailer was released during E3 2012, two weeks before the game's release. During the 2012 Game Developers Conference held in San Francisco, a 45-minute hands-on demo of the game was presented.

A demo was released on Xbox Live on June 19, 2012.

Release
Lego Batman 2: DC Super Heroes was released in North America on June 19, 2012, for the Microsoft Windows, PlayStation 3, Wii, Xbox 360, PlayStation Vita, Nintendo 3DS and Nintendo DS, followed by a release in Europe on June 22, 2012. The game was released digitally on Windows through Steam, and later expanded to the Epic Games Store on September 19, 2019.

An OS X version of the game developed by Feral Interactive was released on September 6, 2012. TT Games later developed a port for the Wii U that was released on May 21, 2013 in North America and on May 24, 2013 in Europe. A mobile version titled Lego Batman: DC Super Heroes was released for iOS on March 25, 2013 and for Android on March 2, 2016.

Downloadable content
Two add-on packs, the Heroes Pack and the Villains Pack, were released exclusively for the PlayStation 3 and Xbox 360 versions of the game. The Heroes Pack included five new characters: Nightwing, Katana, Shazam, Zatanna and Damian Wayne. The Villains Pack included five new characters as well: Bizarro, Captain Cold, Black Adam, Black Manta and Gorilla Grodd. These packs were originally released as pre-order bonuses for certain retailers.

Reception

Lego Batman 2: DC Super Heroes received mostly positive reviews. According to the review aggregation site Metacritic, the 3DS version of the game received an average review score of 72/100, the PC and PlayStation 3 versions both received a score of 81/100, the PlayStation Vita version had 62/100, the Wii U version had 77/100, and the Xbox 360 version had 79/100.

Eurogamers Dan Whitehead gave the game a 9/10, and stated it would be an "absolute joy for adults" and "revelation" for kids. Whitehead also labeled the game as "phenomenally assured" and "pleasurable to explore". IGNs Greg Miller drew similar claims, stating the game did exploring better than any game done before it.

Game Informers Andrew Reiner highlighted the dialogue between Batman and Robin and the narrative the game presented, in comparison to its predecessor, and appreciated the depth of Gotham City. Push Square's Mike Mason, writing about the PlayStation 3 version of the game, also brought up a similar point to the former, although experienced technical issues such as the initial time to load the game taking longer than expected and a delay which switching characters.

GameSpot'''s Tom McShea gave the game a less positive review, criticizing it for non-challenging AI, lackluster vehicle controls and tedious combat, although praised it for its open-world concept and visual design. Writing about the Wii U version of the game, Nintendo Life's Gaz Plant criticized the lack of improvements made and the incoherent usage of the GamePad, but like McShea also praised its open-world concept.

The Nintendo 3DS and PlayStation Vita versions of the game received mixed reviews. Nintendo Power criticized the 3DS version's lack of innovation like Plant while PlayStation: The Official Magazine criticized the Vita version's formulaic approach to the Lego series.

Sales
According to NPD Group, Lego Batman 2 was the best-selling video game for June 2012, selling 450,000 units that month. By March 4, 2013, it was reported that Lego Batman 2 had sold 3.4 million copies.

LegacyLego Batman 3: Beyond Gotham was announced on May 24, 2014, and released on November 11, 2014, for Android, iOS, Microsoft Windows, Nintendo 3DS, OS X, PlayStation 3, PlayStation 4, PlayStation Vita, Wii U, Xbox 360 and Xbox One. Following the events of Lego Batman 2: DC Super Heroes, the story follows the Justice League as they attempt to stop Brainiac from shrinking the planet.Lego DC Super-Villains was announced on May 30, 2018, and released on October 16, 2018, for Microsoft Windows, Nintendo Switch, PlayStation 4, Xbox One and OS X, and is intended to be a spin-off of the series following the various villains in the series as they attempt to stop the Justice Syndicate who pose as the Justice League in their absence while looking for the Anti-Life Equation for Darkseid.

Film adaptation
A direct-to-video film adaptation of the game was released by Warner Premiere on May 21, 2013 as Lego Batman: The Movie – DC Super Heroes Unite. The film was directed by Jon Burton and produced by TT Animation and uses cutscenes from the game as well as new scenes to replace gameplay.

References

Bibliography
 Lego Batman 2: DC Super Heroes''. Authored by Stephen Stratton. Published by Prima Games, 2013.

External links
Lego Batman 2: DC Super Heroes at Lego.com 

2012 video games
Video game sequels
Action-adventure games
Batman video games
Superhero crossover video games
DC Super Heroes
Video games based on Justice League
Batman 2: DC Super Heroes
Sentient toys in fiction
Games for Windows certified games
IOS games
MacOS games
Nintendo DS games
Nintendo 3DS games
Open-world video games
Ouya games
PlayStation 3 games
PlayStation Vita games
Superman video games
Traveller's Tales games
Video games set in psychiatric hospitals
Video games based on DC Comics
Warner Bros. video games
Wii games
Wii U games
Wii U eShop games
Windows games
Xbox 360 games
Multiplayer and single-player video games
Split-screen multiplayer games
Feral Interactive games
Video games set in the United States
3D platform games
Video games scored by Rob Westwood
BAFTA winners (video games)
Video games developed in the United Kingdom